Tenggilis Mejoyo is a subdistrict in the East Surabaya with an area of 5.52 square kilometers that accommodate 37153 males and 39001 females.

Districts of East Java